Composition 192 is a live album by composer and saxophonist Anthony Braxton with vocalist Lauren Newton, recorded at Queen Elizabeth Hall in 1996 and released on the Leo label.

Reception

The Allmusic review by Scott Yanow stated "This is one of the stranger Anthony Braxton recordings. Braxton (heard on various reeds, particularly the sopranino) and singer Lauren Newton perform a 62½-minute piece. ... As the composer states in the liners, there is no development, attempt at creating melodies or desire to stick to a certain tonality; instead, this is what he dubbed "ghost trance music." Definitely for specialized taste".

Track listing
 "Composition 192" (Anthony Braxton) – 62:30

Personnel
 Anthony Braxton – flute, clarinet, bass clarinet, contrabass clarinet sopranino saxophone, alto saxophone, F saxophone
Lauren Newton – vocals

References

Anthony Braxton live albums
1998 live albums
Leo Records albums